Friday the 13th Part III is a 1982 American slasher film directed by Steve Miner, produced by Frank Mancuso Jr., and starring Dana Kimmell, Paul Kratka, and Richard Brooker. It is the sequel to Friday the 13th Part 2 (1981) and the third installment in the Friday the 13th franchise. Set directly after the events of the previous films, the plot follows a teenage girl (Kimmell) and her friends who go on a trip to a house near Crystal Lake where a wounded Jason Voorhees (Brooker) has taken refuge until reemerging for another killing spree. The film marks the first appearance of Jason's signature hockey mask, which has since become a trademark of both the character and the franchise, as well as an icon in American cinema and the horror genre in general.

The original storyline was supposed to focus on a post-traumatic Ginny Field who began learning self-defense and returned to college after surviving her ordeal in the previous film. After finding Paul's corpse inside her dormitory, she prepares to track down Voorhees and face him in a final confrontation. However, this concept was abandoned when Amy Steel declined to reprise her role.

Friday the 13th Part III was theatrically released in 3D, and is the only film in the series to be released in that format. The film was intended to end the series as a trilogy; however, unlike many of its successors, the film did not include a moniker in its title to indicate it as such. The film was theatrically released on August 13, 1982, grossing $36.7 million at the US box office on a budget of $2.2 million, and received negative reviews from critics. It was the first film to remove E.T. the Extra-Terrestrial from the number-one box office spot and became the second highest-grossing horror film of 1982, behind Poltergeist. It has the third most attendance of the Friday the 13th franchise, with approximately 11,762,400 tickets sold. It was followed by Friday the 13th: The Final Chapter (1984).

Plot
Following his committing a series of murders the night before, a badly injured and unmasked Jason Voorhees goes to a lakefront store for a change of clothes. While there, he murders the store owner Harold and his wife Edna. Meanwhile, Chris Higgins and her friends travel to Higgins Haven, her old home on Crystal Lake, to spend the weekend. The gang includes pregnant Debbie, her boyfriend Andy, prankster Shelly, his blind date Vera (who does not reciprocate his feelings), and stoners Chuck and Chili. After running into a man named Abel who warns them to turn back, the gang meets Chris' boyfriend Rick at their destination.

At a convenience store, Shelly and Vera get into a confrontation with bikers Ali, Fox, and Loco. Shelly gets in the car and knocks down their motorcycles, impressing Vera. Later, the bikers show up at Higgins Haven, where they take the gas out of the van and attempt to burn the barn down to get even. Jason, who has been hiding in the barn, murders Fox and Loco with a pitchfork before beating Ali unconscious. That night, Chris and Rick head out into the woods, where Chris reveals that she was attacked by a deformed man two years prior, which prompted her to leave Crystal Lake in the first place; the main reason that she returned was to confront her fears and escape the trauma.

Back at Higgins Haven, Shelly scares Vera with a hockey mask and then wanders into the barn, where Jason slashes his throat. Taking his mask to conceal his face, Jason emerges from the barn. Vera retrieves Shelly's wallet from under the dock and is shot in the eye with a speargun. Jason enters the house and slices in half a hand-standing Andy with a machete. Debbie finishes her shower and rests on a hammock, where Jason thrusts a knife through her chest from beneath. When the power goes out in the house, Chuck goes downstairs to the basement only for Jason to hurl him into the fuse box, electrocuting him. Chili finds that everyone else is dead and is then impaled with a hot fire poker.

When Rick's car dies, Chris and Rick are forced to walk back to the house to find it in disarray. Rick steps outside to search the grounds, but Jason grabs him and crushes his skull with his bare hands, making one of his eyes pop out of its socket. Jason then attacks Chris, who narrowly escapes the house and tries to flee in her van. The van runs out of gas and Chris makes her way to the barn to hide, but Jason attacks her again. Inside the barn, Chris strikes Jason over the head with a shovel and hangs him. He regains consciousness and temporarily removes his mask to get free from the noose, which causes Chris to recognize him as the same man who attacked her two years prior. A still-living Ali tries to attack Jason, but Jason quickly finishes him off. The distraction allows Chris to strike Jason in the head with an axe. He staggers momentarily towards her before finally collapsing. Exhausted, Chris pushes a canoe out into the lake and falls asleep.

Chris has a nightmare of an unmasked Jason running towards her from the house before disappearing, which then turns into the decomposing body of Pamela Voorhees, with her head attached, emerging from the lake to pull her in. The following morning, the police arrive and escort a traumatized Chris away from Higgins Haven. Jason's body is shown to still be lying in the barn as the lake is shown, seemingly at peace.

Cast

Production

Development
Initially, one of the earlier drafts for Part III was Ginny (Amy Steel) from the previous film being sent to a psychiatric hospital and confined there. Suffering from the events of Part 2, she eventually finds out that Jason Voorhees survived from his wound and tracks her down to the hospital, murdering the staff and other patients at the hospital. At the time, Steel turned down the role due to her involvement in other projects, resulting in significant script changes. Steel recalled: "They really wanted me for Part III. They didn't have a script, but they were just going to show me some sort of outline. Then my agents got involved, and I don't know if it was a money issue or a script issue, but I didn't do it."

Screenwriter Ron Kurz, who had written Part II, was offered to draft a screenplay, but also turned the project down. Husband-and-wife screenwriting duo Martin Kitrosser and Carol Watson instead were hired to write the screenplay for Part III, completing the first draft. Paramount subsequently brought in Petru Popescu to alter the screenplay and make it "more sinister and menacing." Though the final filmed version of the script contained significant contributions from Popescu, he remained uncredited.

The script for Part III called for Jason to wear a mask to cover his face, having worn a bag over his head in Part 2; this mask would become a trademark for the character, and one instantly recognizable in popular culture in the years to come.

Casting
Screenwriter Popescu said casting was based on looks rather than talent, and recalled that his vision of the characters was at significant odds with the cast chosen by director Steve Miner. Dana Kimmel was cast in the lead role of Chris Higgins after Miner had become aware of her involvement in Sweet Sixteen, another slasher film she had appeared in with Bo Hopkins and Susan Strasberg. Tracie Savage, who had previously worked as a child actor, was offered the role through her agent. Larry Zerner was discovered by casting directors while walking along a street, and was offered the role of Shelly. For the role of Jason Voorhees, Miner cast British stuntman Richard Brooker.

Filming
Georgetown Productions, who had produced the previous two installments in the Friday the 13th series, was initially involved in the pre-production of Part III, agreeing with distributor Paramount Pictures to shoot the film with 3-D cameras, making it the first Paramount film produced in 3-D since Jivaro in 1954. Paramount leased two 3-Depix cameras from the photography company Marks Polarized Corporation to shoot the film. Simultaneously, Paramount executive Al Lo Presti was researching current 3-D camera technology with the intention of developing a 3-D lens to be owned and used exclusively by Paramount.

According to a September 1982 issue of Forbes magazine, Sirius II Corp. owner Gale Weaver visited the set of Friday the 13th Part III, reportedly over producer Frank Mancuso, Jr.'s worries that faulty projection lenses at cinemas would prevent the film from having a wide theatrical release. Over a two-week period, Weaver developed a prototype lens that would be adaptable to "almost all theater projectors"; Paramount subsequently awarded Sirius II Corp. $1 million to manufacture the lenses, which would be used in projection—to the exclusion of Marks projection lenses. Marks Polarized Corporation subsequently filed a $25 million lawsuit against Paramount, alleging that the studio was "monopolizing the marketing of 3-D exhibition materials, as well as providing deductions to theaters choosing to lease projection lenses directly from Paramount." Paramount ultimately agreed to credit Marks Polarized Corporation onscreen with the statement: "Filmed utilizing the Marks 3-Depix® Converter," but the company was denied an injunction that would have required Paramount to change its equipment.

Friday the 13th Part III was shot on location at the Valuzet Movie Ranch in Saugus, California. It was the first film in the series not to be shot on the East coast. The house, barn, and lake featured in the film were all custom-built. The house remained on the ranch lot until it burnt down in 2006. Additional photography for the film's grocery store scenes took place at a small market in Green Valley, California.

Because of the newness of the 3-D camera lenses, the shooting process was extensive, with the crew sometimes taking hours to set up a shot, and the cast performing multiple takes of scenes in order for the cinematographer to properly capture the 3-D effects. Actor Larry Zerner recalled that perfecting the 3-D effects often superseded the actors' performances: "It quickly became clear that most of the time, the performances didn't matter. When we were shooting the scene at the convenience store with the gang members and I had to throw a wallet at the camera, it was, "Hit the camera!" Then, after ten takes it was "Hit the camera, asshole!"" Actress Tracie Savage echoed this sentiment, stating that "it didn't matter how the lines were delivered."

The decision to dress Jason Voorhees in his now-signature hockey mask occurred during a lighting check on set; the film's 3-D effects supervisor Martin Sadoff was a hockey fan, and supplied a Detroit Red Wings goaltender mask to Miner. Miner loved the mask, but during test shots found it was too small. Using a technique called VacuForm, makeup effects director Doug White enlarged the mask and created a new mold to work with. After White finished the molds, art director Terry Ballard placed new red triangles on the mask to give it a unique appearance. Holes were also punched into the mask, and the markings were altered, making it different from Sadoff's original template. There were two prosthetic face masks created for Richard Brooker to wear underneath the hockey mask. One mask was composed of approximately 11 different appliances, and took about six hours to apply to Brooker's face; this mask was used for scenes where the hockey mask was removed. In the scenes where the hockey mask is over the face, a simple head mask was created. This one piece mask would simply slip on over Brooker's head, exposing his face but not the rest of his head.

Music

The film's music was composed by Harry Manfredini, who previously composed the scores of the series' first two installments. A disco theme was also included in the film, co-written by Manfredini and Michael Zager, who shared a credit with a fictional band called Hot Ice. The theme was included on releases of the film's soundtrack, and according to Manfredini, became popular at disco and gay clubs at the time.

Upon the release of the third film in 1982, Gramavision Records released an LP album of selected pieces of Manfredini's scores from the first three Friday the 13th films. On January 13, 2012, La-La Land Records released a limited edition 6-CD boxset containing Manfredini's scores from the first six films. It sold out in less than 24 hours. An additional double LP was released by Waxwork Records in 2015, along with other soundtracks in the series.

Release

Theatrical
Friday the 13th Part III was released theatrically in the United States on Friday, August 13, 1982. It was the first-ever 3-D film to receive a wide domestic release, opening on 1,079 screens. Of these screens, 813 were 3-D capable, while the remainder consisted of drive-in theaters which were unable to accommodate the format. In order to allow non-3-D-capable theaters to screen the film, Paramount completed a seven-week-long conversion process that cost $2 million, "an amount equal to the picture’s entire negative cost."

Home media
Friday the 13th Part III was first made available on home video on VHS in 1983 by Paramount Home Entertainment. It was also released on CED. Paramount reissued the VHS on September 28, 1994. Paramount later issued a DVD edition, with the film presented only in standard 2-D form, on October 17, 2000. The 2-D version was subsequently included in a box set, titled From Crystal Lake to Manhattan, released in 2004, and featuring the first eight films in the series; this disc features an audio commentary track with several cast members, moderated by historian Peter Bracke.

The 3-D version of the film was eventually released on DVD by Paramount in February 2009, and included two pairs of cyan and red 3-D glasses. In June of that year, a "Deluxe Edition" Blu-ray edition (which includes both the 2-D and 3-D versions) was released, also with two pairs of cyan and red 3-D glasses designed to look like Jason's mask.

The film was included in a further three Blu-ray sets: Friday the 13th: The Complete Collection released in 2013, Friday the 13th: 8-Movie Collection in 2018 and Friday the 13th Collection: Deluxe Edition in 2020.

Reception

Box office
The film grossed $9,406,522 in its opening weekend and broke the opening horror film record held by Friday the 13th (1980). Domestically, the film made a total of $36.7 million. It placed number 21 on the list of the top-grossing films of 1982, facing strong competition from other high-profile horror releases such as Poltergeist, Creepshow, The Thing, Halloween III: Season of the Witch, The Slumber Party Massacre, X-ray, Visiting Hours, Amityville II: The Possession, The Beast Within, Cat People and Venom.  As of 2020, it still stands as the fourth highest-grossing film in the Friday the 13th series and the third best selling in ticket sales; with approximately 11,762,400 tickets sold, it is surpassed only by the 1980 original with 14,778,700 tickets and Freddy vs. Jason with 13,701,900 tickets. The film also stands as the tenth highest-grossing R-rated film of 1982, the second-highest grossing horror film of 1982, the sixth largest box office opening of 1982, and adjusted for inflation it is the ninth highest-grossing slasher film of all time.

Critical response
On the review aggregator website Rotten Tomatoes, Friday the 13th Part III holds an approval rating of 7% based on 27 reviews, with an average rating of 3.7/10. The site's critics consensus reads: "Jason may solidify his iconic wardrobe in this entry, but Friday the 13th Part 3 lacks any other distinguishing features, relying on a tired formula of stab and repeat." On Metacritic, it has a weighted average score of 30 out of 100, based on seven critics, indicating "generally unfavorable reviews."

While criticizing the plot for being derivative, in a mixed review for The New York Times, film critic Janet Maslin praised the acting of Kimmell, Savage, Rogers, and Parks, in which she called a major improvement to the acting in the predecessors, and wrote that Miner's use of 3-D filmmaking was innovative and the most professional effort when compared to other films released at the time, stating: "As in each of the other recent 3-D movies, of which this is easily the most professional, there is a lot of time devoted to trying out the gimmick. Titles loom toward you. Yo-yos spin. Popcorn bounces. Snakes dart toward the camera and strike. Eventually, the novelty wears off, and what remains is the now-familiar spectacle of nice, dumb kids being lopped, chopped and perforated." She also felt the film was superior to prior two films in the series.

Writing for the Los Angeles Times, Linda Gross wrote: "Ironically, Friday the 13th Part 3 is so terrible that Friday the 13th Part 1 and Friday the 13th Part 2 don't seem so bad." Richard Schickel of Time magazine wrote: "Maybe all sequels should be made in 3-D... It is all so gruesome that horror turns to humor and fun comes from the appreciation of being cleverly conned by Steve Miner. The way the eyeball of one of Jason's victims pops out of his skull and seems to sail over the audience's head is alone worth buying a ticket and putting on funny glasses." Gene Siskel praised the film's "impressive" 3-D effects, particularly in the opening credits, also noting its slowburn approach, as the "heavy-duty slaughter doesn't come until one hour into the film," but criticized it for "lingering over the impending deaths of the young women, who are stalked by the camera so we find ourselves in the revolting position of stalking them too."

The entertainment-trade magazine Variety provided a general consensus, stating, "Friday the 13th was dreadful and took in more than $17 million. Friday the 13th Part 2 was just as bad and took in more than $10 million. Friday the 13th Part 3 is terrible, too." The magazine added, "There are some dandy 3-D sequences, however, of a yo-yo going up and down and popcorn popping." Similarly, TV Guide awarded the film one out of five stars, writing that it "exploits precisely the same formula plot as its predecessors, though the gore is a bit deemphasized, with the special-effects crew concentrating on the nicely done 3-D depth work for a change. It's still trash, however, and also made a ridiculous amount of money."

Accolades
The film is recognized by American Film Institute in these lists:
 2003: AFI's 100 Years...100 Heroes & Villains:
 Jason Voorhees – Nominated Villain

Analysis
In his book Legacy of Blood: A Comprehensive Guide to Slasher Movies (2004), the film scholar Jim Harper wrote extensively on the film's final girl character, Chris, who suffers from childhood trauma resulting from sexual assault, which leaves her unable to engage in intimate relationships, although there is no undisputed evidence of what has really happened to her. In the film, Chris' trauma stems from an attack she survived from Jason Voorhees, which leaves her "mentally scarred." According to Jim Harper's interpretation, in comparison to the final girl characters in other contemporaneous slasher films such as Halloween (1978) or A Nightmare on Elm Street (1984), Chris' failure to engage in sexual relations is a function of trauma as opposed to "repress[ion] or dysfunct[ion]."

Legacy
Friday the 13th Part III has been most noted for its introduction of villain Jason's hockey mask disguise, which was replicated in the following numerous sequels and became an iconic image in American cinema and the horror genre. Film scholar Carol Clover notes that the film has historically been cited as one of the most violent of the series, with a total of fourteen murder sequences. 
For his appearance in the film, Jason Voorhees was nominated for AFI's 100 Years...100 Heroes & Villains as one of the Top 50 Villains. Meslow cites the film's 3-D effects as paving the way for later horror films which also used the technique.

Other media

Novelization
Friday the 13th Part III was followed by Friday the 13th: The Final Chapter (1984). Uniquely, the film was novelized twice. The first book was written by Michael Avallone and published in 1982 to coincide with the release of the film, while the second adaptation was published in 1988 by Signet. The latter novelization was written by Simon Hawke, who had previously written novelizations for the first, second, and sixth installments in the series.

Notes

References

Sources

External links

 
 
 Film page at the Camp Crystal Lake web site
 Film page at Fridaythe13thfilms.com

Films about post-traumatic stress disorder
1982 3D films
1980s horror thriller films
1980s serial killer films
Friday Part 3
1982 films
1982 horror films
American horror thriller films
American sequel films
American serial killer films
American slasher films
1980s English-language films
Films directed by Steve Miner
Films scored by Harry Manfredini
Films set in 1982
Films set in 1984
Films set in New Jersey
Films shot in California
3
Paramount Pictures films
Films with screenplays by Petru Popescu
1980s American films